Burkina Faso made its Paralympic Games début at the 1992 Summer Paralympics in Barcelona, sending a tandem of cyclists, a judoka and a weightlifter. The country was represented by a cycling tandem and a powerlifter in 1996, and by a single powerlifter in 2000. Burkina Faso did not take part in the 2004 Games, but returned to the Paralympics in 2008, sending a single cyclist.

Burkina Faso has never taken part in the Winter Paralympics, and no Burkinabé competitor has ever won a Paralympic medal.

Medal tables

Medals by Summer Games

See also
 Burkina Faso at the Olympics

References